The 2022 Northern Arizona Lumberjacks football team represented Northern Arizona University as a member of the Big Sky Conference during the 2022 NCAA Division I FCS football season. They were led by fourth-year head coach Chris Ball and played their home games at the Walkup Skydome.

Previous season

The Lumberjacks finished the 2021 season 5–6 overall, 4–4 in Big Sky play to finish in a tie for seventh place.

Preseason

Polls
On July 25, 2022, during the virtual Big Sky Kickoff, the Lumberjacks were predicted to finish seventh in the Big Sky by the coaches and the media.

Preseason All–Big Sky team
The Lumberjacks had two players selected to the preseason all-Big Sky team.

Offense

Jonas Leader – OL

Defense

Morgan Vest – S

Schedule

Game summaries

at Arizona State

at Sam Houston

No. 22 North Dakota

Idaho

at Portland State

Cal Poly

at UC Davis

at Idaho State

No. 3 Montana State

at Northern Colorado

No. 7 Weber State

References

Northern Arizona
Northern Arizona Lumberjacks football seasons
Northern Arizona Lumberjacks football